Daniel "Dan" Wilding (born 22 January 1989) is an English drummer.

Biography 
Wilding started playing drums at the age of 10 and at the age of 16 joined his first band called Killing Mode. After Killing Mode disbanded he formed a black metal band called Misery.
In 2007 Wilding joined Belgian death metal act Aborted. With them he had recorded Strychnine.213, released in 2008. In 2009 he left Aborted and joined UK technical death metal band Trigger the Bloodshed. He also plays drums for melodic death metal group The Soulless and blackened death metal band The Order of Apollyon. In 2011 he has begun serving as touring drummer for German metalcore band Heaven Shall Burn. In 2012 it was announced that Wilding will also be the drummer for grindcore/death metal veterans Carcass and recorded their latest album titled Torn Arteries.

Wilding is married and has two kids.

Equipment 
Wilding uses Tama drums, Paiste cymbals (as of 2021), Remo drumheads and Vic Firth sticks.  He has formerly used Sabian as well as Meinl cymbals.

Discography

With Aborted 
Strychnine.213 (2008, Century Media Records)

With The Order of Apollyon 
The Flesh (2010, Listenable Records)
The Sword and the Dagger (2015, Listenable Records)

With Trigger the Bloodshed 
Degenerate (2010, Rising Records)
Kingdom Come EP (2011, Independently Released)

With Heaven Shall Burn 
Veto (2013, Century Media Records, guest appearance)

With Carcass 
Surgical Steel (2013, Nuclear Blast)
Surgical Remission/Surplus Steel (2014, Nuclear Blast)
Despicable (2020, Nuclear Blast)
Torn Arteries (2021, Nuclear Blast)

References 

1989 births
Living people
English heavy metal drummers
Carcass (band) members
Death metal musicians
21st-century drummers